Peoria station, also known as Peoria/Smith station, is a Regional Transportation District (RTD) station in Aurora, Colorado. The station is served by the A Line, a commuter rail line from Union Station in Downtown Denver to Denver International Airport, and the R Line, a light rail line crossing through Aurora and South to Lone Tree. A Line travel times from the station to Downtown Denver and Denver International Airport are about 17 and 20 minutes, respectively. Peoria station is the northern terminus of the R Line with a travel time of 58 minutes to the southern terminus at Lincoln station.

Peoria and Union Station are the two locations where RTD commuter rail and light rail meet, and Peoria is the only station facilitating a cross-platform transfer between the two systems.

Peoria station is also served by several TheRide bus routes and has a 550-space park-and-ride lot.

The A Line began service at Peoria station on April 22, 2016. The R Line began service on February 24, 2017.

References 

RTD commuter rail stations
2016 establishments in Colorado
Railway stations in the United States opened in 2016
Transportation buildings and structures in Aurora, Colorado